Duke of Seville is a title of Spanish nobility that was granted in 1823 by King Ferdinand VII of Spain to his nephew, Infante Enrique of Spain. The Dukes of Seville are members of the Spanish branch of the House of Bourbon, and they are also Grandees of Spain.

Since 22 October 1968, the holder of the ducal title has been Don Francisco de Borbón y Escasany, 5th Duke of Seville.

List of holders of the title

Sources
 Juan Martina Torres, The History of Spanish Nobility, 1500–present (Madrid 2009), for the: Universidad Complutense de Madrid (UCM) (translated title)

References

External links

 
Dukedoms of Spain
Grandees of Spain